The Freedom Tower is a building in Miami, Florida. It was designed by Schultze and Weaver and is currently used as a contemporary art museum and a central office to different disciplines in the arts associated with Miami Dade College. It is located at 600 Biscayne Boulevard on Miami Dade College's Wolfson Campus. 

On September 10, 1979, Freedom Tower was added to the U.S. National Register of Historic Places. On October 6, 2008, it was designated a U.S. National Historic Landmark for its role in hosting Cubans as they fled communist Cuba for Florida following the 1959 Cuban Revolution. On April 18, 2012, the AIA's Florida Chapter placed the building on its list of Florida Architecture: 100 Years. 100 Places as the Freedom Tower / Formerly Miami News and Metropolis Building.

Freedom Tower is served by the Miami Metrorail at the Government Center Station and the Historic Overtown/Lyric Theatre station, as well as by the Metromover at the Freedom Tower station on the Omni Loop.

History

Originally completed in 1925 as the headquarters and printing facility for the newspaper The Miami News, the Freedom Tower is an example of a Mediterranean Revival styled structure with design elements borrowed from the Giralda in Seville, Spain. Its cupola on a 255-foot (78 m) tower contained a decorative beacon.
The Federal government of the United States used the facility in the 1960s to process and document refugees from the Cuban Revolution and to provide medical and dental services for them. After the major era of refugees ended, in 1972, the federal government sold the building to private buyers in 1974. In 1979, the building was listed on the National Register of Historic Places.

The New World Mural 1513, painted in 1988 by The Miami Artisans; Wade S. Foy, John Conroy, William Mark Coulthard, Phylis Shaw, Gerome Villa Bergsen and Ana Bikic. The mural is situated in the Grand Hall on the second floor; however, it sometimes has limited access for the public. The mural is a recreation of the ruined original from 1926, originally commissioned by the tower's developer James Middleton Cox in 1926 and again in 1987 by architect Richard Hiessenbottle RA. The center poem by Edwin Markham, poet Laureate for the Lincoln Memorial address.

In 1997, the building was purchased for US$4.1 million by the family of the prominent Cuban-American businessman and anti-Communist Jorge Mas Canosa. The Mas family then restored the tower to its original state and converted it into a memorial to the refugees who fled to the United States from Cuba. It housed a museum, library, meeting hall, and the offices of the Cuban American National Foundation. Salsa legend Celia Cruz was memorialized at the Freedom Tower upon her death in 2003, with more than 200,000 turning out to show their respects.

In 2005, Terra Group father and son, Pedro and David Martin, along with 600 Biscayne LLC and its members purchased the Freedom Tower from the Mas Family. This purchase eventually led to the Freedom Tower being donated to Miami Dade College, under the leadership of Miami-Dade College President, Dr. Eduardo Padron. As part of the donation agreement, the College was required to create a Cuban exile experience, and today it is used as a museum, cultural center, and an education center.

The building has a heavy history and is reinventing itself once again as it lends itself to a new purpose. The building is gaining a significant amount of local recognition for its major exhibitions and growth as an institution of art, serving the community as a non-profit organization. The MDC Museum of Art + Design is on the second floor of the building and offers a wide range of exhibits, which are free and open to the public. The Freedom Tower is home to the Cuban American Museum.

On April 13, 2015, Cuban-American Florida Senator Marco Rubio chose the Freedom Tower as the venue for the announcement of his presidential campaign, citing the significance of the location as a beacon representing freedom for Cuban-Americans.

On September 17, 2015, His Majesty The King of Spain, Felipe VI, received the Presidential Medal, the highest distinction from Miami-Dade College, from its President Eduardo Padron.

On May 10, 2022, Gov. Ron DeSantis announced that $25 million investment to preserve, refurbish and enhance the Freedom Tower.The proposal will be considered during the upcoming legislative session, and will be included in Governor DeSantis’legislative budget recommendation.

Gallery

References

External links

 National Park Services' National Historic Landmark description
 Florida's Office of Cultural and Historical Programs
 Dade County listings
 Great Floridians of Miami
 Cuban American National Foundation
 Chronology of the tallest buildings in Florida

Office buildings completed in 1925
Mediterranean Revival architecture in Florida
National Historic Landmarks in Florida
National Register of Historic Places in Miami
Skyscrapers in Miami
Tourist attractions in Miami
Museums in Miami
Art museums and galleries in Florida
University museums in Florida
Miami Dade College
1925 establishments in Florida